Jennifer McGrath Fitzpatrick is an American engineer. One of the first female engineers at Google, she is currently the senior vice president for Google Core Systems & Experiences.

Education 
Fitzpatrick graduated from Stanford University in 1999. She earned a Bachelor of Science in symbolic systems, and a master's degree in Computer Science. She began using Google as a student, and joined the company's Summer Intern Program in 1999. She was one of four interns.

Career 
One of Google's first 30 employees, Fitzpatrick was hired by Google's founders following her internship. She reported to Marissa Mayer, who became her mentor. To improve gender diversity at Google, Fitzpatrick and Mayer insisted that at least one female executive interview every job candidate.

Fitzpatrick has led software development for products and teams including AdWords, Google News, Google Maps, Product Search, corporate engineering and the Google Search Appliance, and co-founded Google's user experience. She holds a US design patent for the iconic graphical user interface of the Google search engine home page.

References 

Stanford University alumni
American women engineers
1976 births
Living people
Google employees
21st-century women engineers
21st-century American businesspeople
21st-century American women